The Bistra is a right tributary of the river Sebeș in Romania. It discharges into the Tău Reservoir, which is drained by the Sebeș, near Tău Bistra.

References

Rivers of Romania
Rivers of Sibiu County